For the film about the Chinese artist see Ai Wei Wei: Never Sorry

Never Sorry: A Leigh Koslow Mystery is a crime novel by the American writer Edie Claire set in contemporary Pittsburgh, Pennsylvania.

It tells the story of advertising copywriter Leigh Koslow, who when her fledgling advertising business is short on cash, takes a part-time job at the Pittsburgh Zoo, where she stumbles onto a grisly crime scene.

The novel is the second in a series of five Leigh Koslow mysteries.

"Edie Claire is a bright new mystery writer. The fast-paced story line retains a serious tone with humorous interludes to ease the tension and turn the sleuthing relatives into real people. A winning amateur sleuth tale that showcases a new talent."— Midwest Book Review

Sources
Contemporary Authors Online. The Gale Group, 2006.

External links
  Author's homepage

1999 American novels
American crime novels
Novels set in Pittsburgh
Signet Books books